The Moldovan Divizia Națională is the name of the handball league of Moldova.

2016/17 Season participants

The following 6 clubs compete in Divizia Națională during the 2016–17 season.

Divizia Națională past champions 

 1999 : PGU-Kartina TV Tiraspol
 2000 : PGU-Kartina TV Tiraspol (2)
 2001 : PGU-Kartina TV Tiraspol (3)
 2002 : PGU-Kartina TV Tiraspol (4)
 2003 : PGU-Kartina TV Tiraspol (5)
 2004 : PGU-Kartina TV Tiraspol (6)
 2005 : PGU-Kartina TV Tiraspol (7)
 2006 : PGU-Kartina TV Tiraspol (8)
 2007 : PGU-Kartina TV Tiraspol (9)
 2008 : PGU-Kartina TV Tiraspol (10)
 2009 : HC Olimpus-85-USEFS
 2010 : PGU-Kartina TV Tiraspol (11)
 2011 : HC Olimpus-85-USEFS (2) 
 2012 : PGU-Kartina TV Tiraspol (12)
 2013 : PGU-Kartina TV Tiraspol (13)
 2014 : HC Olimpus-85-USEFS (3)
 2015 : PGU-Kartina TV Tiraspol (14)
 2016 : HC Olimpus-85-USEFS (4)
 2017 : HC Olimpus-85-USEFS (5)
 2018 : PGU-Kartina TV Tiraspol (15)

EHF coefficient ranking
For season 2017/2018, see footnote:

33.  (35)  GHR A (3.50)
35.  (33)  A1 Andrón (3.00)
36.  (38)  Divizia Națională (2.00)
36.  (39)  Super 8 (2.00)
38.  (30)  Rankinio Lyga (1.83)

External links
 Official website

References

Divizia Națională
Moldova